The Robar RC-50 is a bolt-action anti-materiel precision rifle chambered in .50 BMG (12.7 × 99 mm NATO) manufactured by Robar Companies, Inc. in Phoenix, Arizona. The RC-50 is found in two variants—the original RC-50 (RC-50 Standard) and the side-folding buttstock RC-50F.

Description 
The RC-50 is based on it with the factory's SR-60D development, it is specifically for the special forces set up manual sniper rifle. Like many anti-materiél rifles, the RC-50 can be used to perform anti-sniper missions, destroy enemy light vehicles, radar, aircraft, and annihilate enemy personnel. The sniper rifle is available in two versions, the standard and RC-50F with foldable buttstock, which is folded left and made of fiberglass. In order to reduce the recoil, the RC-50 is equipped with a  muzzle brake, with a cushioning stock. It is equipped with a bipod. The rifle's detachable magazines have a capacity of five rounds of .50 BMG. The RC-50's bolt is similar to the Remington 700 long action, but scaled up to use the larger cartridge. Users can also choose their own preferences to rifle color or coating, the current optional black, gray and camouflage. The RC-50 and its special accessories are housed in a fiberglass case for easy carrying. The dedicated sight is a 16x optical sight, mounted through a bracket at the top of the rifle casing. And taking into account the different operational needs, this gun can also use other sight.

The RC-50 is currently being used by special forces in countries such as Australia, New Zealand, Saudi Arabia, United Kingdom and United States. And has been deployed in Afghanistan and Iraq.

Users 
 
 
 
 
 : Used by the Turkish gendarmerie.
 : Used by the Special Air Service (SAS).
 : United States Coast Guard and United States Special Operations Command.

See also 
 Anti-materiel rifle
 Barrett M95

References

External links 
 Robar RC-50 – Military Factory

.50 BMG sniper rifles
Bolt-action rifles of the United States
Sniper rifles of the United States
Anti-materiel rifles